Gadila  may refer to:
 MV Gadila, an Anglo Saxon Royal Dutch/Shell oil tankers converted to become a Merchant Aircraft Carrier
 Gadila (mollusc), a tusk shell genus in the family Gadilidae